Derby ministry may refer to:

 First Derby ministry, the British government led by Lord Derby from February to December 1852
 Second Derby ministry, the British government led by Lord Derby from 1858 to 1859
 Third Derby ministry, the British government led by Lord Derby from 1866 to 1868